Josef Fanta (7 December 1856 in Sudoměřice u Tábora – 20 June 1954 in Prague) was a Czech architect, furniture designer, sculptor and painter.

A student of Josef Zítek, Fanta developed into one of the most prominent representatives of Czech Art Nouveau architecture. He created many notable public architectural works including the Prague Railway Station (first called the Franz Josef Station, and nicknamed "one of the final glories of the dying empire") the Ministry of Trade Building in Prague, the Ondřejov Observatory, and the 1912 Peace Monument in Prace which commemorates the Battle of Austerlitz.

From 1918, Fanta was a member of the Czech Academy of Sciences and Arts.

See also
List of Czech painters

References

Czech architects
Czech architectural sculptors
Czech male sculptors
1856 births
1954 deaths
Furniture designers
Railway architects
Art Nouveau architects
19th-century Czech painters
Czech male painters
20th-century Czech painters
20th-century Czech sculptors
19th-century sculptors
People from Tábor District
19th-century Czech male artists
20th-century Czech male artists